This is a list of utilities for performing disk partitioning.

List

Disk partitioning software
Lists of software